A Terry stop in the United States allows the police to briefly detain a person based on reasonable suspicion of involvement in criminal activity. Reasonable suspicion is a lower standard than probable cause which is needed for arrest. When police stop and search a pedestrian, this is commonly known as a stop and frisk. When police stop an automobile, this is known as a traffic stop. If the police stop a motor vehicle on minor infringements in order to investigate other suspected criminal activity, this is known as a pretextual stop. Additional rules apply to stops that occur on a bus.

In the United States at the federal level, the Supreme Court has published many cases that define the intersection between policing and the Fourth Amendment protection against unreasonable searches and seizures. However, Congress has not defined a baseline for police behavior. There has been some state action at both the legislative and judicial levels, and also some cities have passed laws on these issues.

There is concern that Terry stops do not account for possible implicit bias of officers, and possibly results in racially skewed decisions. Communities that have high rates of incarceration may experience more intense and punitive policing and surveillance practices even during periods of time when general crime rates are decreasing.

Origins 

{| class="wikitable" style="float:right; vertical-align: top; text-align: left; width: 400px; margin-left:2em"
|+ align="bottom" |Terry v. Ohio used only the "reasonableness clause" from the Fourth Amendment
|-
| <small>The right of the people to be secure in their persons, houses, papers, and effects, against unreasonable searches and seizures, shall not be violated,...</small>
! style="background: LightSalmon;"|Reasonableness
|-
| ...and no Warrants shall issue, but upon probable cause, supported by Oath or affirmation, and particularly describing the place to be searched, and the persons or things to be seized.
! Warrant
|}

The concept of a Terry stop originated in the 1968 Supreme Court case Terry v. Ohio, in which a police officer detained three Cleveland men on the street behaving suspiciously, as if they were preparing for armed robbery. The police conducted a pat down search and discovered a revolver, and subsequently, two of the men were convicted of carrying a concealed weapon. The men appealed their case to the Supreme Court, arguing that the search in which the revolver was found was illegal under the Fourth Amendment. This brief detention and search were deemed admissible by the court, judging that the officer had reasonable suspicion which could be articulated (not just a hunch) that the person detained may be armed and dangerous. This was not mere "suspicion" but "reasonable suspicion" which could be articulated at a later date.

This decision was made during a period of great social unrest in the United States in the 1960s, with rising crime, opposition to U.S. involvement in the Vietnam War and the civil rights movement, and race riots. It was thought that law enforcement needed to be provided with tools to deal with the unrest and new issues of urban crime. Some criticized the decision for watering down the prohibition against unreasonable searches and seizures; others praised it for balancing safety and individual rights.

Elements

The United States Supreme Court held that where: (1) a police officer observes unusual conduct by a subject; (2) the subject's conduct leads the Officer reasonably to conclude that criminal activity may be afoot, and that the subject may be armed and presently dangerous; (3) the officer identifies himself as a policeman; (4) the officer makes reasonable inquiries; and (5) nothing in the initial stages of the encounter serves to dispel the officer's reasonable fear for safety, the officer may conduct a carefully limited search of the outer clothing of the subject in an attempt to discover weapons, and that such a search is a reasonable search under the Fourteenth Amendment, so that any weapons seized may properly be introduced in evidence.

Expansion through case law

Reasonable suspicion

To have reasonable suspicion that would justify a stop, police must have "specific and articulable facts" that indicate the person to be stopped is or is about to be engaged in criminal activity. Because officers usually do not have supervision when they encounter civilians, they have discretion who to stop. Reasonable suspicion depends on the "totality of the circumstances". Reasonable suspicion is a vague term and the Supreme Court concluded it should be decided on a case-by-case basis. Often it is built out of a combination of facts, each of which would, in itself, not be enough justification for the stop.

The suspicion must be of an individual person. Police officers primarily use situational factors based on criminal behavior to determine if a stop is needed. In essence, when they witness a person behaving suspiciously or violating the law, they will stop them. Other factors influencing decision include personal attitudes and the decision-making model where the officer works. Racial profiling can be systemic.

The three types of primary sources that the Court accepts to determine suspiciousness are information obtained from third parties, information based on the suspect’s appearance and behavior, and the time and place of the suspected offense. Officers can define what they believe is normal, and if and how the suspect deviates from this. Reasonable suspicion has been used for actions like standing in the wrong place, nervousness, exceptional calmness, or walking quickly in another direction. Officers' experience may make them suspicious of behavior that is usually innocuous. For instance, a social interaction such as a hug or a handshake can be perceived as a drug deal. Suspecting people because they fit into a broad category, such as being in a particular location, being of a particular race or ethnicity, or fitting a profile, are insufficient for reasonable suspicion. However, stop-and-frisk has been validated on the basis of furtive movements; inappropriate attire; carrying objects such as a television or a pillowcase (in English law, "going equipped"); vague, nonspecific answers to routine questions; refusal to identify oneself; and appearing to be out of place.

Before 1968, the law required substantial evidence to impede liberty or seize property. But the Fourth Amendment does not protect consensual encounters. During the Terry case, the Supreme Court found that the police should have the power to search, even without probable cause, to protect themselves from weapons. The Terry stop operates under the assumption that though stop and frisk is an intrusion, the potential harm from weapons outweighs it.

The cases following Terry expanded the power of the police. While the original case was concerned with armed violence and firsthand observation by officers, Adams v. Williams (1972) extended the doctrine to drug possession backed up by the secondhand hearsay of an informant. The Adams v. Williams case set a precedent in that police did not need a first person observation but could get information from a confidential informant instead. Regarding this case, Justice Marshall stated, "Today's decision invokes the specter of a society in which innocent citizens may be stopped, searched, and arrested at the whim of police officers who have only the slightest suspicion of improper conduct." United States v. Hensley (1985) ruled that police officers may stop and question suspects when they believe they recognize them from "wanted" flyers issued by another police department. In Illinois v. Wardlow (2000), a person's unprovoked flight from Chicago police officers in "an area known for heavy narcotics trafficking" constituted reasonable suspicion to stop him.

Usually during a Terry stop, the police ask those they detain to identify themselves. Several states require people to provide their names to the police. In Hiibel v. Sixth Judicial District Court of Nevada (2004), these stop and identify statutes were deemed constitutional. While the specifics of "stop and identify" statutes and ordinances vary, a significant number of states and local jurisdictions have "stop and identify" statutes. In New York, Courts have limited the effects of Terry by creating a four level continuum of intrusion each of which requires its own level of suspicion. This allows police officers who encounter individuals on the street to approach an individual with as little as an articulable and objective credible reason. In People v. DeBour, New York's highest Court permitted the police to stop an individual for crossing the street when the individual observed the police.

Lacking reasonable suspicion, police may stop a person based on a hunch, constituting a "consensual" stop. United States v. Mendenhall found that police are not generally required to advise an individual that they were stopped on a consensual basis and that they may leave at any time. A person can typically determine if a stop is consensual by asking, "Am I free to go?". If the officer responds in the negative or does not respond, the person is being detained under a Terry stop; otherwise the person may leave. Mendenhall also found that a consensual stop can be converted into an unconstitutional Terry stop by circumstances such as "the threatening presence of several officers, the display of a weapon by an officer, some physical touching of the person of the citizen, or the use of language or tone of voice indicating that compliance with the officer's request might be compelled". Police who conduct an unconstitutional Terry stop can face administrative discipline and a civil suit.

In Pennsylvania v. Mimms, two police officers gave Mimms a ticket for driving a car with expired car tags. When they asked him to step out, they realized that he had a gun, and promptly arrested him. The Court ruled in favor of the police, citing officer safety as their reasoning. Dissenting justices found that this furthers the expansion of Terry. Since the officers were allowed to ask Mimms to step out of the car, this set a precedent that officers could now ask citizens to perform actions through warrantless intrusion.

Search

A frisk, also known as a pat-down, of the surface of a suspect's garments is permitted during a Terry stop, but must be limited to what is necessary to discover weapons, and must be based on a reasonable suspicion the individual may be armed. However, pursuant to the plain feel doctrine (similar to the plain view doctrine), police may seize contraband discovered in the course of a frisk, but only if the contraband's identity is immediately apparent.

The Supreme Court has placed very liberal requirements on what is "immediately apparent" regarding contraband. For example, in conducting a pat-down search, an officer feels a hard pack of cigarettes; the officer removes the pack and examines the inside, discovering drugs. He can be allowed to do this because he has prior knowledge, based on experience, that a small switchblade or tiny gun could be hidden in such a box.

Subsequent court cases have expanded the definition of what constitutes a frisk, and what is considered as admissible evidence. In Michigan v. Long, Terry stops were extended to searching the inside of a car passenger compartment if police have reasonable suspicion an occupant may have access to a weapon there. In Minnesota v. Dickerson, the court ruled that "immediately recognized" contraband discovered during a Terry stop is also a lawful seizure.

 Consensual search 
Based on the Supreme Court decision in Schneckloth v. Bustamonte (1972), a person waives Fourth Amendment protections when giving voluntary consent to a search. Police are not required to inform a person of their right to decline the search. Justice Marshall, in his dissent in the case, said it is a "curious result that one can choose to relinquish a constitutional right—the right to be free from unreasonable searches—without knowing that he has the alternative of refusing to accede to a police request". Several cities and states require police to inform citizens of their right to deny a search.

 Traffic stops 

For practical purposes, a traffic stop is essentially the same as a Terry stop; for the duration of a stop, driver and passengers are "seized" within the meaning of the Fourth Amendment. The Supreme Court has held that drivers and passengers may be ordered out of the vehicle without violating the Fourth Amendment's proscription of unreasonable searches and seizures. Drivers and passengers may be frisked for weapons upon reasonable suspicion they are armed and dangerous. If police reasonably suspect the driver or any of the occupants may be dangerous and that the vehicle may contain a weapon to which an occupant may gain access, police may perform a protective search of the passenger compartment. Otherwise, lacking a warrant or the driver's consent, police may not search the vehicle, but under the plain view doctrine may seize and use as evidence weapons or contraband that are visible from outside the vehicle.

As decided in Ohio v. Robinette (1996), once an officer returns the driver's identification, there is no requirement that the officer inform the driver they are free to go; therefore, although the encounter has been turned into a consensual encounter, questioning can continue, including a request to search the vehicle.

Pretextual stops
Pretextual stops are a subset of traffic stops deemed constitutional by the Supreme Court in Whren v. United States (1996). They occur when a police officer wishes to investigate a motorist on other suspicions, generally related to drug possession, and uses a minor traffic infringement as a pretext to stop the driver. In the case of Whren, the defense used a "would have" rule: asking if a reasonable police officer would have made the stop without the suspicion of other criminal behavior. Some consider that pretextual stops can allow for racial profiling to occur. There are numerous petty violations a driver may make and the officer can be selective about whom to pull over to investigate. Sixteen states ban pretextual stops based solely upon racial profiling or other  factors:

 Racial disparities 
Police officers may develop schemas after continuously being exposed to certain environments, like high crime minority neighborhoods, which can lead to their association of crime with race instead of suspicious behavior. Officers who have been in the police force for longer are more likely to have suspicions based on non-behavioral reasons. Even forms of American culture that perpetuate negative stereotypes such as blacks being violent can cause those who consume them to associate black people with these stereotypes, even if they do not believe them, making implicit bias a possible factor in arrests. Black and Hispanic people are more likely to be targeted, and are more likely to be stopped than their population and relative crime rates suggest.

Terry stop regulations vary per area. Areas with high crime, like public housing, require less evidence for someone to be stopped. Because more black and Hispanic people tend to live there, they will be stopped more often. In areas that are perceived to have high crimes, more police are deployed, which results in higher arrest rates, which are then used to justify more policing. When controlling for location based stops, Goel found that white people were more likely to have a weapon than black or Hispanic people. Grogger and Ridgeway found that the same proportion of racial groups were stopped during the day and at night, suggesting that stop decisions were not based on the physical appearance of the driver. However, when it came to the post stop outcomes, black people were more likely to be held longer. With regards to marijuana, white people were 50% more likely to be dismissed on the charge, in comparison to black people. The National Research Council states that “more research is needed on the complex interplay of race, ethnicity, and other social factors in police-citizen interactions.”

Kramer and Remster found that there is a 27% increase in likelihood of black civilians experiencing force at a stop compared to a white person, and a 28% increase in likelihood that the officer would draw their gun. Even when the police did not stop the civilians on account of criminal behavior, black civilians are still 29% more likely to experience force compared to their white counterparts. Young civilians are also more likely to experience force compared to older civilians. In New York City between 1996 and 2000, there was a disproportionate number of complaints by blacks about officers' use of force. Governmental and nongovernmental organizations investigations have confirmed that police-perpetrated abuse has affected a sizeable number of civilians, especially blacks. Vrij and Winkel state that because black and white people have different styles of nonverbal communication, officers are more likely to interpret the actions of black people as fidgety, to use a greater range of voice and pitch, and to avoid eye contact with the officer, which causes the officer to treat them with suspicion.

A stronger police presence and more respect towards the residents are simultaneously desired in poor, minority neighborhoods. According to Cooper, police officers will attempt to use their power to enforce their masculinity. A majority of police officers are men, and the majority of civilians stopped are also men. Because of this, police officers are susceptible to the phenomena of the culture of honor stance and hypermasculinity, in which they are more prone to physical aggression in order to protect their social standing. This can result in police brutality, especially towards men of color. This can also explain why police officers tend to punish for disrespect, as a question of their authority is a challenge to their manhood.

Immigration does not have a positive correlation with crime, but immigrants are disproportionately enforced, stopped, and arrested within their racial/ethnic communities. Immigrants from racial and ethnic communities tend to be more unaware of what to do when stopped by the police, which is something that officers can take advantage of. After being stopped more often, immigrants may hold distrust towards the police. Because immigrant children feel that they are always viewed with suspicion, they begin to believe that they actually are a criminal.

In Riverland, California, gang-related Latinos have an inherent distrust of the police trying to build trust, since they believe that police officers are trying to gain something instead of protect them. Some police officers believe that this stop-and-frisk is for the sake of protecting the community and preventing youth members from joining gang related activity. For this purpose, police officers track Latino people using data like photos, frequent stops, and social media to figure out gang-associated activities, which often results in more overall stops for Latinos.

 Effects 

 Usage of force 
The experience of minority citizens, who are both more likely to be stopped by police and more likely to experience the use of force by the police after being stopped, has been characterized as a racial or ethnic "double jeopardy". Acts of police force cause injury, death, civil litigation, public outrage, civil disorder, and a distrust towards the police.

Eric Garner and NYPD, Freddie Gray and the Baltimore police, and Michael Brown and the Ferguson police are notable examples of police force at Terry stops that ended tragically. Although racial disparities in the frequency of Terry stops are well known, less is known about the nature, prevalence, and factors predictive of use of force during Terry'' stops.

Morrow et al. studied NYPD's SQF (stop, question, and frisk) records in 2010 to determine the frequency of force used at stops and whether the citizen's race/ethnicity was a factor in the decision to use force. SQF tactics were found to disproportionately target minorities, regardless of control over variables like social and economic factors, precinct crime rates, and neighborhood racial or ethnic composition. SQF tactics did not seem to actually address crime either, as only 6% of stops yielded an arrest and only 0.15% of stops yielded a gun. In 2013, 44% of young minority New Yorkers had been stopped by NYPD nine or more times.

Using the US Census Bureau's data from 2012, Morrow et al. analyzed racial/ethnic disparities in the use of force among NYPD. Force was classified as hands, suspect on ground, suspect against wall, weapon drawn, weapon pointed, baton, handcuffs, pepper spray, and other; these were then categorized as no force, physical/non-weapon force, and weapon force. They found that non-weapon force occurred in 14.1% of SQF. However, when this was further separated by racial categories, while for whites, only 0.9% experienced non-weapon force, 7.6% blacks and 5.0% Hispanics experienced non-weapon force, eight to nine times more likely than whites. There is a possibility that these results are due to implicit biases of police officers, which could be shaped by previous experiences in the workforce.

Psychological and emotional harm 
A stop and frisk can be damaging to communities. Kwate and Threadcraft argue that stop and frisk is a public health problem and works to "produce bodies that are harassed, stressed and resource deprived, if not altogether dead". Stop and frisk creates an environment of fear that alters the behaviors of a community's inhabitants and limits their freedom of action. The police conduct pat-downs that intrude upon the privacy of the individual, and can result in escalation through physical or sexual violence. During this process, officers sometimes use profanity and discriminatory slurs. Because of this, residents often have anger, fear, or distrust towards the police.

For those with mental disorders and disabilities, pat-downs can be traumatic, especially for those with sensory disorders. Those who have suffered through sexual trauma, which is prevalent among men with criminal justice histories and black people in poorer urban areas, can relive their trauma through the invasive procedure, resulting in stress, depression, and anxiety. This practice also increases the possibility of sexual exploitation or assault, especially in communities that are more vulnerable, like black and poor sex workers and sex trafficking victims. Because ways of transporting drugs have evolved, some police officers utilize methods such as stripping the civilian and searching their body for drugs, which can be traumatizing for both users and nonusers of drugs. Civilians have also reported that police officers often wait until their quota is filled up to bring the arrested civilians back to stations. Civilians must stay in the back of the van, which often was missing seats, for hours on end and packed with 15 or 16 people, without access to the bathroom.

In a study conducted by Cooper et al., young men who do not use drugs stated that they feel uncomfortable when stopped by a police officer because they were afraid that "unnecessary violence or life disruption was imminent during every police stop". Those who have been stopped more often develop more allostatic load, resulting in low self esteem and despair. When residents of a community know they are being treated both unfairly, and unfairly due to their social identity, they are more likely to anticipate stigma and rejection due to their race. Marginalized communities that experience recurring injustice from the police distrust them and become more cynical of them, resulting in legal cynicism, which in turn results in decreased cooperation and respect toward the legal system. This loss of faith in the system causes depressed civic and political engagement. Community residents are less likely to call for the police to help when they believe the police are not on their side, instead turning towards other community members. This distrust towards police is passed down from generation to generation, otherwise known as legal socialization, as a means of protection, forcing the community to live in perpetual fear.

Items that are discovered during pat-downs that are incriminating, like clean needles, condoms, and other harm reduction tools, are used less to prevent arrest; this then is a danger to public health.

Solutions 
Many police departments all over the country have adapted courtesy policing as a response to criticism of racial profiling and police violence. Courtesy policing is when the police build rapport with the community through respect and friendliness. Legitimacy policing is a method used by police officers to interact with the community, where, in order to achieve a desired outcome, police officers utilize both punitive and courtesy strategies. While courtesy policing is used to gain trust and collect information, the punitive approach is used whenever it appears that the stopped people did not comply, making the police more aggressive; these approaches are adapted on a shifting continuum to the actions of the people they stop. People of color are more likely to see this community policing as degrading.

Cooper believes that in order to address hypermasculinity, which increases physical aggression in the police force, officers should be taught to not use command presence (where they use an authoritative tone of voice or even become physically violent) in situations where it is not needed. It should still be used when the officer is in a dangerous situation, but not when a situation does not require force. Instead of the officer punishing the harm doer, the officer should instead make it a goal to have a full understanding of the situation. Police training culture should not emphasize aggressive approaches and instead advocate for a more patient approach. An emphasis should be put on how to communicate with civilians who challenge their authority. Officers should also be made aware of any potential biases they may have.

Terry was originally created to prevent imminent armed robberies. However, 90% of individuals who are stop-and-frisked in New York City were free to leave afterwards. This demonstrates that they were not about to do serious criminal activity, which goes against Terry’s purpose of preventing serious crime. Hutchins wishes to narrow the scope of Terry, and prevent certain police encounters from happening in the first place, and proposes to limit the reach of Terry stops so that officers may not stop someone based on a possessory offense under nothing more than reasonable suspicion. Goel calls for the optimization of stop relating to criminal possession of a weapon (CPW). Because having a lower threshold of evidence to stop someone disproportionately affects black and Hispanic people, optimization would result in less racial disparities for terry stops. Goel examines NYPD’s three million stops for cases where the stop yielded an individual involved with criminal possession of a weapon. In approximately 43% of these stops, there was less than 1% of a chance that the suspect had a weapon. Goel found that five stop circumstances are more likely to increase the likelihood of recovering a weapon for a stop: suspicious weapon, sights and sounds of criminal activity, suspicious bulge, witness report, and ongoing investigation.

Kwate and Threadcraft advocate for three ways to address Stop and Frisk, as a public health issue. First, they believe the health department’s city wide health surveys should include Stop and Frisk encounters, so that the data can be used to investigate health outcomes of a Stop and Frisk. Second, within 24 hours, reports of traumatic stops should be received by the city. Third, a registry should be created in which communities can report police encounters. Torres calls for more comprehensive data in stop and frisk reports. Specifically, since Latinos can also be white and black, current data is not as accurate.

Data collection
The following states require stop-and-frisk data collection:

Using public record requests, the Stanford Open Policing project amassed 60 million state traffic stops in 20 states over the period 2011 through 2015.

North Carolina was the first state in the country to require the release of all traffic stop data starting in 2000. Researchers have analysed 20 million traffic stops from this data finding that African Americans as a share of the population were twice as likely to be pulled over than whites and four times as likely to be searched. Hispanics were not more likely to be pulled over, but had a higher likelihood of being searched.

There is a push to release more open police data nationwide. In 2015, the White House launched the Police Data Initiative which, has 130 participating police departments, some of which provide data sets on stop-and-frisk. The 130 departments cover 15% of the population.

See also 
 Consent search case law
 Stop-and-frisk in New York City
 Sus law
 Powers of the police in England and Wales#Search without arrest

Notes

References

Further reading

External links 
 United States Supreme Court - Terry v. Ohio - Court Documents

Ethically disputed judicial practices
African-American-related controversies
Race-related controversies in the United States
Law enforcement in the United States
Law enforcement techniques
Privacy law in the United States
Searches and seizures